Events from the year 1315 in the Kingdom of Scotland.

Incumbents
Monarch – Robert I

Events
 26 April – Scottish Parliament, meeting at Ayr, proclaims Edward as legal heir to King Robert as King Robert had no legal heir at that point.
 26 May – Edward and his fleet (and more than 5,000 men) land on the Irish coast at points at and between Olderfleet Castle at Larne to initiate an invasion of Ireland.

See also

 Timeline of Scottish history

References

 
Years of the 14th century in Scotland
Wars of Scottish Independence